The Campeonato Nacional Feminino (English: Women's National Championship), also known as Liga BPI for sponsorship reasons, is the top-tier women's association football league in Portugal. It is run by the Portuguese Football Federation and began in 1993. An initial ten teams compete in the league, which replaced the Taça Nacional as the highest level of women's football in Portugal. The current champions are Benfica, who won their second consecutive title in 2022. The most successful team is S.U. 1º de Dezembro, with 12 titles.

History 
One of the first women's football national championship in Portugal began in 1985, under the title Taça Nacional. It included all clubs interested in participating and comprised two stages, in the first stage clubs were divided in different zone groups with the top clubs from each zone advancing to the second stage to decide the champion. Boavista dominated this competition, winning all its eight editions. The competition was renamed Campeonato Nacional for the 1993–94 season though keeping the same format. On the 1998–99 season, more matches were added to the competition as clubs not advancing to the championship stage played would play again between them. In 2001, the UEFA Women's Cup was created with the previous season winners of this competition qualifying to play on it. The Portuguese cup started on the 2003–04 season with all clubs competing on it.

In 2005, the Campeonato Nacional II Divisão was created, leaving only the top 6 teams on the first tier, each one playing the others 4 times with the bottom team being relegated. The competition was expanded for the 2009–10 season to 10 teams, playing each other twice, with top clubs advancing to a championship group and bottom teams to a relegation group. A supercup, played between the championship winners and cup winners, started in 2015.

For the 2016–17, the Portuguese Football Federation granted direct entrance to the first tier to four Primeira Liga teams, with Sporting CP, Braga, Estoril and CF Os Belenenses taking the spots. This teams had to keep the women's team for at least three seasons and introduce Under-19 sides to promote youth football. This way, Sporting CP and Braga became the first professional women's football teams in Portugal. That same season, the format was reverted to a single stage, where the 14 teams (reduced to 12 on the following season) play each other twice. The league cup was introduced for the 2019–20 season with teams qualifying through mid-season standings on the championship. That season was interrupted due to the COVID-19 pandemic in Portugal with no title awarded and no teams relegated. This was the first time no title was awarded since the creation of the competition. This led to a total of 20 teams on the first tier on the following season, requiring a format change for that season, with a first stage where teams are divided in two groups playing each other once with top teams advancing to a championship group and bottom teams to relegation groups.

Competition format

Competition 
As of 2016–17, there are 12 clubs in the Campeonato Nacional. During the course of a season (from September to May) each club plays the others twice (a double round-robin system), once at their home stadium and once at that of their opponents', for 22 games. Teams receive three points for a win and one point for a draw. No points are awarded for a loss. Teams are ranked by total points, then head-to-head points, head-to-head goal difference, goal difference, matches won, and goals scored. If still equal, a play-off match at a neutral venue decides rank. The two lowest placed teams are relegated into the Campeonato Nacional II Divisão, and the top two teams from the Campeonato Nacional de Promoção are promoted in their place.

Qualification for European competitions 
The winner of Campeonato Nacional qualifies for the UEFA Women's Champions League qualifying round.

Clubs 

For the 2021–22 season:

List of champions 
The following teams won the league:

Taça Nacional

Campeonato Nacional

Teams by titles

Performance by club

Notes

References

External links
 Women's League at fpf.pt
 Portuguese league at UEFA
 Portuguese league at women.soccerway.com

Port
1
Recurring sporting events established in 1986
1993 establishments in Portugal
Women
Women's sports leagues in Portugal
Campeonato Nacional de Futebol Feminino
Professional sports leagues in Portugal